Abdulbasit Ali Hindi (born 2 February 1997) is a Saudi Arabian footballer  who plays as a centre-back for Saudi Pro League side Al-Ahli.

Career statistics

Club

References

External links
 
 

1997 births
Living people
People from Jizan Province
Saudi Arabian footballers
Association football defenders
Saudi Professional League players
Saudi First Division League players
Al-Amjad FC players
Al-Ahli Saudi FC players
Saudi Arabia youth international footballers
Olympic footballers of Saudi Arabia
Footballers at the 2020 Summer Olympics
Saudi Arabian people of Indian descent